The Conservatorio Luigi Cherubini is located in piazza delle Belle Arti in Florence. The conservatory, among the most important in Italy, is named after the Florentine composer Luigi Cherubini (1760–1842).

History
The conservatory occupies part of a former nunnery which was closed in the 18th century by the Grand Duke of Tuscany.

Alumni
 Luigi Dallapiccola
 Sylvano Bussotti
 Albert Mayr
 Francesco Filidei
 Eva Mei
 Benedetto Ghiglia 
 Andrea Portera
 Susanna Rigacci
 Sergio Maltagliati
 Stefano Bollani

Faculty
 Luigi Dallapiccola
 Roberto Lupi
 Pietro Grossi
 Riccardo Gandolfi

Musical instruments museum

The conservatory acquired a notable collection of musical instruments, mainly dating from the time of the Grand Duchy of Tuscany. They are displayed to the public as the Museo degli strumenti musicali, accessed via the Galleria dell'Accademia, which is best known as the home of Michelangelo's David. The instruments include:
  instruments by Stradivari from a set by this luthier which belonged to the Medici court
 Medici cello (1690)
 Medici tenor viola (1690) 
6 controviolino by Valentino De Zorzi
a viola by Igino Sderci 
a violin and a viola by Luciano Sderci
a doublebass by Bartolomeo Cristofori
 keyboard instruments by Bartolomeo Cristofori, the inventor of the piano, who was employed by the Medici to look after their instruments

References

External links
 Official website

Music schools in Italy
Buildings and structures in Florence
Education in Florence